is a Japanese manzai (stand-up) comedy duo (kombi) from Sapporo consisting of  a.k.a. "Taka" as boke and  a.k.a. "Toshi" as tsukkomi. They are under contract to the entertainment agency, Yoshimoto Kogyo. Formed in 1994, they are best known for their stand-up acts and as TV tarentos in variety shows.

Sketch comedy 
As the boke, Taka is prone to silly comments, while Toshi is the more reasonable of the two, often criticizing Taka's remarks, shooting tsukkomi saying "such-and-such ka!" (i.e. "Ōbei ka!"), and hitting Taka on the head for his silly response.

"Ōbei ka!" (pronounced "oh-bay-ka!") is their most known tsukkomi gag. It is a sarcastic way of saying, “Are you Western?"

One example of their skits has the following lines:
Toshi: Let's have a drink. I'll have a beer.
Taka: Then I'll have a Diet Coke.
Toshi: You're not an American! Have a beer! And what would you like to eat?
Taka: I'll have a cherry pie.
Toshi: You're not an American!
Taka: A meat pie.
Toshi: You're not an American!
Taka: A chocolate  bar.
Toshi: You're not an American!
Taka: Sushi and tempura! (with an American accent).
Toshi: You're not an American!

Biography 

The comedians first met in 1990 at Nishioka-kita Junior High in Sapporo when they were both in the 8th grade. In 1994, they passed an audition held by Yoshimoto Kogyo. Initially working in Sapporo, the two moved to Tokyo in 2002 to work nationwide.

Members 
 
 Date of Birth: April 3, 1976
 Birthplace: Sapporo, Hokkaido
 Manzai Role: Boke

 
 Date of Birth: July 17, 1976
 Birthplace: Asahikawa, Hokkaido
 Manzai Role: Tsukkomi

Awards 
Nationwide Yoshimoto Young Manzai-shi Awards presented by Television Shizuoka (テレビ静岡主催 全国吉本若手漫才)  1st place (1997)
The 10th Warai no Kin-medal - Neta Battle (笑いの金メダル - ネタバトル) Gold medal (2004)
M-1 Grand Prix (M-1グランプリ) 4th place (2004)
The 7th Bakushō On-air Battle Championship (爆笑オンエアバトルチャンピオン大会) 1st place (2005)
The 8th Bakushō On-air Battle Championship (爆笑オンエアバトルチャンピオン大会) 1st place (2005)
The 45th Golden Arrow Awards, Broadcasting Award (Variety Section) (2008)
The 8th Beat Takeshi's Entertainment Awards, Japan Show Biz Award (2008)

Media

TV 
Regular
Monday　
Otameshika! (お試しかっ!) -- TV Asahi
Hoko Tate (ほこ×たて) -- Fuji TV
Tuesday　
Waratte Iitomo! (森田一義アワー 笑っていいとも!) -- Fuji TV
Jimoto Ōen Variety Konohen!! Traveler (地元応援バラエティ このへん!!トラベラー) -- HTB
Gyōten Quiz! Chin Rule Show (仰天クイズ! 珍ルールSHOW) -- TV Tokyo
Wednesday　
Futtonda (フットンダ) -- Chūkyō TV
Thursday
Iknari! Ōgon Densetsu. (いきなり!黄金伝説。) -- TV Asahi
Friday
Game & Quiz Variety Peke Pon (ゲーム&クイズバラエティ ペケ×ポン) -- Fuji TV
Gekkan Soccer Earth -- Nippon TV *Every 4th Friday
Saturday
Tensai! Shimura Dōbutsuen (天才!志村どうぶつ園) -- Nippon TV
Sunday
Waratte Iitomo! Zōkan-gō (笑っていいとも!増刊号) -- Fuji TV
Dōda! Presents Taka Toshi Bokujō (どぉーだ! Presents タカトシ牧場) -- Hokkaido Cultural Broadcasting

Semi Regular
SmaStation—TV Asahi *Saturday
SMAP×SMAP -- Kansai TV, Fuji TV *Monday
Tunnels no Mina-san no Okage Deshita (とんねるずのみなさんのおかげでした) -- Fuji TV *Thursday

Irregular
Taka Toshi & Nukumizu ga Iku Chiisana Tabi Series (タカトシ&温水が行く小さな旅シリーズ) -- Fuji TV
Special Program Bakushō Sokkuri Monomane Kōhaku Utagassen Special (爆笑そっくりものまね紅白歌合戦スペシャル) -- Fuji TV

External links 
Taka and Toshi official website provided by Yoshimoto Kogyo
Taka and Toshi's videos that Yoshimoto Kogyo officially presents at Youtube

1976 births
Living people
People from Hokkaido
Japanese comedy duos